Ciuta is a three-act play by Victor Ion Popa first performed in 1922 at National Theatre Bucharest.

Bibliography
 Paul Prodan, Teatrul românesc contemporan, [1920-1927], Fundația Culturală Principele Carol pag. 221-224
  Ștefan Cristea, Victor Ion Popa, viața și descrierea operei: contribuții documentare, Ed. Minerva, 1973
 Vicu Mîndra, Victor Ion Popa, Ed. Albatros, 1975
 Vicu Mîndra, Istoria literaturii dramatice românești: De la începuturi pînă la 1890, Ed. Minerva, 1985

See also
 List of Romanian plays
1922 plays
Romanian plays